Significant events of national importance have been occasions for the issue of commemorative notes in Sri Lanka. The Central Bank of Sri Lanka has issued two commemorative notes. In 1998 a 200 rupees note was issued on Independence day to commemorate the 50th Independence Anniversary of the country. The note was issued along with three commemorative coins; a five thousand rupees gold coin, a one thousand rupees silver coin, and a ten rupees bi-metallic coin. The 200 rupees commemorative note was the first time a Sri Lankan note had been issued in polymer plastic produced by Note Printing Australia. The artwork was done by Ananda Somathilake and Gamini Mendis. Only a limited number of notes were issued. The note is being removed from circulation, and is rarely seen. Currently about 3% of the ~20.5 million notes issued are in circulation or with collectors. 

In 2009 the 1000 rupees note commemorating the end of the Sri Lankan Civil War and the Ushering of Peace and Prosperity note was issued. The note is dated two days after the end of the war as 2009-05-20. The note is the first time since 1954, that an image of a living person has been used on Sri Lankan currency notes. It is a paper note, with a limited number issued.

200 rupee note (1998)

1000 rupee note (2009)

500 rupee note (2013)

1000 rupee note (2018)

See also
 Sri Lankan commemorative coins

References

External links
 LakdivaNotes Collection
 Commemorative Notes from Sri Lanka

Currencies of Sri Lanka
Commemorative banknotes